Omar Pumar (born 18 September 1970 in Caracas) is a former Venezuelan cyclist.

Career achievements

Major results
1992
1st Overall Clasico Ciclistico Banfoandes
1998
1st Stage 11 Vuelta al Táchira
2000
1st Stage 9 Vuelta al Táchira

Grand Tour general classification results timeline

References

1970 births
Living people
Venezuelan male cyclists
Cyclists at the 2000 Summer Olympics
Olympic cyclists of Venezuela